In mathematics, a Petrovsky lacuna, named for the Russian mathematician I. G. Petrovsky, is a region where the fundamental solution of a linear hyperbolic partial differential equation vanishes. 
They were studied by  who found topological conditions for their existence.

References
.
.
.
.

Hyperbolic partial differential equations
Shock waves